The New York State Civil Service Commission is a New York state government body that adopts rules that govern the state civil service; oversees the operations of municipal civil service commissions and city and county personnel officers; hears appeals on examination qualifications, examination ratings, position classifications, pay grade determinations, disciplinary actions, and the use of preferred lists; and requests to continue the employment of individuals who are retired. Its regulations are compiled in title 4 of the New York Codes, Rules and Regulations.

It is composed of three members: the president of the commission, who is also the head of the Department of Civil Service, and two commissioners. Members are appointed by the governor with the advice and consent of the Senate for terms of six years, and not more than two of the three can be members of the same political party.

See also 
 Bushey v. New York State Civil Service Commission
 New York City Civil Service Commission

References

External links 
 New York State Department of Civil Service
 Department of Civil Service in the New York Codes, Rules and Regulations

Civil Service
Civil service in the United States